Thomas Wolsey (circa 1470–1530) was an English statesman and clergyman.

Wolsey may also refer to:


People
Louis Wolsey (1877–1953), American rabbi
Henry Wolsey Bayfield (1795–1885), British hydrographic surveyor

Places
Wolsey, South Dakota, United States
Wolsey Shale, a geologic formation in Montana

Other uses
Wolsey (clothing), one of the oldest textile companies in the world
, a British destroyer commissioned in 1918 and sold in 1947 for scrapping
Wolsey (cat), a Doctor Who spin-off companion

See also
Wolseley (disambiguation)
Woolsey (disambiguation)